Calvin C. Johnson Sr. was a member of the Ohio Senate from January 3, 1967 – February 9, 1970. His district encompassed the majority of the city of Cincinnati.  He was succeeded by Bill Bowen. His son, Calvin C. Johnson Jr. is an author.

References

1929 births
Democratic Party Ohio state senators
Politicians from Cincinnati
Living people